is a Japanese professional basketball player. He plays for the Altiri Chiba of the B.League. 
Okada also is a member of the Japan national basketball team, debuting for the team in the FIBA Asia Championship 2009.

Okada averaged 8.9 points per game the Japanese team at the 2009 championship, including a game-high 30 points on 10 3-pointers in a 148-45 preliminary round victory over Sri Lanka.  Despite his performance, Japan stumbled to a disappointing tenth place finish, its worst ever performance in 24 FIBA Asia Championship appearances.

Okada played professionally with the Toyota Alvark of the JBL Super League.  In the 2009-10 season, Okada entered the month-long winter break averaging 8.1 points per game for the Alvark.

Certified Public Accountant
Okada earned Japanese CPA license in November 2010.

3x3 clubs
He owns Dime 3x3 teams in Tokyo, Osaka and Hachinohe.

Career statistics 

|-
| align="left" |  2007-08
| align="left"  rowspan="7" | Toyota
| 30|| || 9.9|| .273|| .247|| .875|| 0.6|| 0.1|| 0.2|| 0.0||  3.2
|-
| align="left" | 2008-09
| 35|| || 20.2|| .418|| .426|| .708|| 1.2|| 0.8|| 0.6|| 0.1||  9.5
|-
| align="left" |  2009-10
| 41|| || 19.1|| .413|| .438|| .700|| 1.1|| 1.0|| 0.5|| 0.0||  7.1
|-
| align="left" | 2010-11
| 36|| || 27.1|| .386|| .344|| .824|| 1.4|| 0.9|| 0.4|| 0.1||  9.3
|-
| align="left" |  2011-12
| 42|| 42|| 23.3|| .407|| .390|| .714|| 1.4|| 0.9|| 0.5|| 0.1||  9.6
|-
| align="left" | 2012-13
| 42|| 42|| 21.2|| .377|| .377|| .667|| 1.3|| 0.8|| 0.4|| 0.1||  8.2
|-
| align="left" |  2013-14
| 54|| 54|| 18.9|| .398|| .415|| .676|| 1.3|| 0.8|| 0.4|| 0.1||  7.4  
|-
| rowspan="2" align="left" |  2014-15
| align="left" | Tsukuba
| 16|| 15|| 28.1|| .297|| .321|| .783|| 1.4|| 1.2|| 1.0||0.0||   8.7 
|-
| align="left" | Hiroshima D
| 28|| 0|| 22.7|| .322|| .311|| .775|| 2.4|| 1.7|| 0.6|| 0.0||  7.7
|-
| align="left" | 2015-16
| align="left" | Chiba
| 54|| 34|| 21.3|| .396|| .400|| .848|| 1.1|| 0.6|| 0.3|| 0.0||  5.1
|-
| align="left" |  2016-17
| align="left" | Kyoto
| 60|| 60|| 28.0|| .347|| .349|| .859|| 1.7|| 1.4|| 0.5|| 0.0||  10.2
|-
| align="left" |  2017-18
| align="left" | Kyoto
| 60|| 60|| 23.5|| .381|| .359|| .844|| 1.4|| 1.3|| 0.3|| 0.1||8.1
|-

External links
Youtuber Okada

References

1984 births
Living people
Chiba Jets Funabashi players
Cyberdyne Ibaraki Robots players
Hiroshima Dragonflies players
Japanese men's basketball players
Point guards
Alvark Tokyo players
Basketball players at the 2010 Asian Games
Kyoto Hannaryz players
Earth Friends Tokyo Z players
Altiri Chiba players
Asian Games competitors for Japan